Big Ship is the fifth studio album by Freddie McGregor. The album was released in 1982. The backing band was the Roots Radics and it was mixed by Scientist.

Track listing 
"Big Ship" - 3:18
"Sweet Lady" - 3:11
"Peaceful Man" - 3:45
"Stop Loving You" - 3:09
"Get Serious" - 3:06
"Don't Play The Fool" - 3:15
"Get United" - 3:21
"Let Me Be The One" - 3:27
"Roots Man Skanking" - 3:19
"Holy Mount Zion" - 3:13

1982 albums
Freddie McGregor albums
Greensleeves Records albums